In mathematics, in the field of differential geometry, the Yamabe invariant, also referred to as the sigma constant, is a real number invariant associated to a smooth manifold that is preserved under diffeomorphisms.  It was first written down independently by O. Kobayashi and R. Schoen and takes its name from H. Yamabe.

Definition 
Let  be a compact smooth manifold (without boundary) of dimension .  The normalized Einstein–Hilbert functional  assigns to each Riemannian metric  on  a real number as follows:

 

The exponent in the denominator is chosen so that the functional is scale-invariant: for every positive real constant , it satisfies .

We define

 

This infimum is finite (not ): Hölder's inequality implies .

 is the standard metric on the -sphere .  It follows that if we define

 

The

The Yamabe invariant in two dimensions 
In the case that , (so that M is a closed surface) the Einstein–Hilbert functional is given by

 

where  is the Gauss curvature of g. Therefore, for surfaces, we conclude that

 

Examples 
In the late 1990s, the Yamabe invariant was computed for  large classes of 4-manifolds by Claude LeBrun and his collaborators. In particular, it was shown that most compact complex surfaces have negative, exactly computable  Yamabe invariant, and that any Kähler–Einstein metric of negative scalar curvature  realizes the Yamabe invariant in dimension 4. Most of these arguments involve Seiberg–Witten theory, and so are specific to dimension 4.

An important result due to Petean states that if  is simply connected and has dimension , then . In light of Perelman's solution of the Poincaré conjecture, it follows that a simply connected -manifold can have negative Yamabe invariant only if . On the other hand, as has already been indicated, simply connected  -manifolds do in fact often have negative Yamabe invariants.

Below is a table of some smooth manifolds of dimension three with known Yamabe invariant. In dimension 3, the number  is equal

By an argument due to Anderson, Perelman's results on the  Ricci flow imply that the constant-curvature metric on any hyperbolic 3-manifold realizes the Yamabe invariant. This provides us with infinitely many examples
of 3-manifolds for which the invariant is both negative and
exactly computable.

Topological significance 
The sign of the Yamabe invariant of  holds important topological information.  For example,  is positive
if and only if  admits a metric of positive scalar curvature.  The significance of this fact is that much is known about the topology of manifolds with metrics of positive scalar curvature.

See also
Yamabe flow
Yamabe problem
Obata's theorem

Notes

References 

 M.T. Anderson, "Canonical metrics on 3-manifolds and 4-manifolds", Asian J. Math. 10  127–163 (2006).
 K. Akutagawa, M. Ishida, and C. LeBrun, "Perelman's invariant, Ricci flow, and the Yamabe invariants of smooth manifolds", Arch. Math. 88, 71–76 (2007).
 H. Bray and A. Neves, "Classification of prime 3-manifolds with Yamabe invariant greater than ", Ann. of Math. 159, 407–424 (2004).
 M.J. Gursky and C. LeBrun, "Yamabe invariants and  structures", Geom. Funct. Anal. 8965–977 (1998).
 O. Kobayashi, "Scalar curvature of a metric with unit volume", Math. Ann. 279, 253–265, 1987.
  C. LeBrun,  "Four-manifolds without Einstein metrics", Math. Res. Lett. 3 133–147 (1996).
  C. LeBrun,  "Kodaira dimension and the Yamabe problem,"  Comm. Anal. Geom.  7 133–156  (1999).
 J. Petean, "The Yamabe invariant of simply connected manifolds",  J. Reine Angew. Math.  523   225–231 (2000).
 R. Schoen, "Variational theory for the total scalar curvature functional for Riemannian metrics and related topics", Topics in calculus of variations, Lect. Notes Math. 1365, Springer, Berlin, 120–154, 1989.

Differential geometry
Differential topology